Diane Beamer (born 15 July 1960) is an Australian politician. As an Australian Labor Party member of the New South Wales Legislative Assembly, she represented the state electorates of Badgerys Creek (1995–1999) and Mulgoa (1999–2011). This included ministerial roles in the Carr and Iemma governments. Beamer chose not to recontest the 2011 election. In December 2018, Labor endorsed Beamer as their candidate for the Division of Lindsay at the 2019 Australian federal election. She was defeated by the Liberals' Melissa McIntosh.

Early life and education
Born in England, Beamer migrated with her parents to Australia in the early 1960s. During their first years in Sydney, the family lived in a Nissen hut at Cabramatta Migrant Hostel.

In 1975, Beamer joined the Emu Plains Branch of the Australian Labor Party. She later graduated from the University of Sydney with a Bachelor of Arts (BA).  From 1985 to 1989, Beamer worked as an electorate officer for the Minister for Sport and Tourism John Brown.

Civic roles
Between 1989–95, Beamer served as an elected councillor of the City of Penrith. This included 1992-93 as Deputy Mayor and 1993-94 as Mayor. She has also been a member of the Board of Ripples Aquatic Centre and a Parliamentary Patron of the Spokeswomen Program.

New South Wales state politics (1995-2011)
In 1991, Beamer unsuccessfully contested the seat of Badgerys Creek, however was elected to it in 1995. Following Badgerys Creek's abolition in 1999, she was elected as Member for Mulgoa. In April 2003, Beamer became Minister Assisting the Minister for Infrastructure and Planning (Planning Administration), Juvenile Justice and Minister for Western Sydney. When Morris Iemma became Premier in August 2005, Beamer was appointed Minister for Fair Trading and Minister assisting the Minister for Commerce while continuing to be Minister for Western Sydney.

Orange Grove Affair 
see also Orange Grove affair

On 16 June 2004, the Department of Infrastructure, Planning and Natural Resources, advised Beamer as Minister Assisting the Minister for Infrastructure and Planning (Planning Administration) to approve a variation of the Local Environment Plan (LEP) which would have retrospectively validated the planning approval for an Orange Grove shopping centre. On 8 July 2004, Beamer declined to approve the proposed variation on the grounds that the shopping centre tended to undermine the viability of the Liverpool shopping centre. The owners of the Orange Grove centre subsequently claimed that this decision was corrupt. This led to an investigation by the Independent Commission Against Corruption (ICAC), which made no findings of corruption against any person.

Retirement from state politics 
After the 2007 election, Beamer served as a backbencher and chose not to recontest the 2011 election.

Australian federal politics (2019)
In December 2018, the Australian Labor Party National Executive endorsed Beamer to take over from Emma Husar as the Labor candidate for the Division of Lindsay at the 2019 Australian federal election.
The seat was won by the Liberals' Melissa McIntosh. Beamer's previous state electorates of Badgerys Creek and Mulgoa cover much of the same geographic area as the seat of Lindsay.

Family and personal life
Beamer has six children. She was married to former Australian politician Stephen Hutchins, but is now married to Sydney journalist David Humphries.

References

 

|-

|-

|-

|-

1960 births
Living people
Australian Labor Party members of the Parliament of New South Wales
Members of the New South Wales Legislative Assembly
21st-century Australian politicians
21st-century Australian women politicians
Women members of the New South Wales Legislative Assembly
Mayors of Penrith, New South Wales
University of Sydney alumni
English emigrants to Australia
Women mayors of places in New South Wales